Aloys Ndimbati (born in the early 1950s) is a Rwandan fugitive war criminal, wanted in connection with his alleged role in the 1994 Rwandan genocide. According to his warrant, as mayor of the Kibuye commune Gisovu, he was present at the scene of and participated in the killings of Tutsis across Kibuye.

Ndimbati has been charged with genocide, complicity in genocide, direct and public incitement to commit genocide, as well as with murder, extermination, rape and persecution as crimes against humanity. The International Criminal Tribunal for Rwanda referred his case to Rwandan authorities in June 2012.

See also
 List of fugitives from justice who disappeared

References

Fugitives wanted by Rwanda
Living people
Mayors of places in Rwanda
People indicted by the International Criminal Tribunal for Rwanda
People from Kibuye
Year of birth missing (living people)